Boston City Council elections were held on November 8, 2011. Eight seats (four district representatives and four at-large members) were contested in the general election, as the incumbents in districts 1, 5, 6, 8, and 9 were unopposed. Three seats (districts 2, 3, and 7) had also been contested in the preliminary election held on September 27, 2011.

At-large
Councillors John R. Connolly, Stephen J. Murphy, Felix G. Arroyo, and Ayanna Pressley were re-elected to the four at-large seats. Pressley's victory made her the first woman of color to be re-elected to the council; entering 2012, she was the only female member of the council.

District 1
Councillor Salvatore LaMattina ran unopposed.

District 2
Councillor Bill Linehan was re-elected.

District 3
Councillor Maureen Feeney, a member of the council since 1994, did not seek re-election; she subsequently took the job of city clerk. Frank Baker was elected.

District 4
Councillor Charles Yancey was re-elected.

District 5
Councillor Robert Consalvo ran unopposed.

District 6
Councillor Matt O'Malley ran unopposed. O'Malley had won his seat through a special election to fill a vacancy for District 6, which took place on November 16, 2010, with the preliminary election on October 19, 2010.

District 7
Councillor Tito Jackson was re-elected. Jackson had won his seat through a special election to fill a vacancy for District 7, which took place on March 15, 2011, with the preliminary election on February 15, 2011.

District 8
Councillor Michael P. Ross ran unopposed.

District 9
Councillor Mark Ciommo ran unopposed.

See also
 List of members of Boston City Council

References

Further reading

External links
 2011 Election Results at boston.gov
 Boston City Council Swearing-In Ceremony at cityofboston.gov (January 2, 2012)

City Council election
Boston City Council elections
Boston City Council election
Boston City Council